Maggy Wauters (born 5 September 1953) is a Belgian athlete. She competed in the women's discus throw at the 1972 Summer Olympics.

References

1953 births
Living people
Athletes (track and field) at the 1972 Summer Olympics
Belgian female discus throwers
Olympic athletes of Belgium
Place of birth missing (living people)